Włoczewo  is a village in the administrative district of Gmina Stara Biała, within Płock County, Masovian Voivodeship, in east-central Poland.

Geography
Wloczewo is located at  52 ° 40'02 "N 19 ° 38'08" E

The village is in the valley of the Vistula river outside of Plock.
In 2011 the population of the village was 141

History
After the Partition of the Polish–Lithuanian Commonwealth, the district was part of the area annexed by Prussia.
In October 1939 the Nazi occupation transferred the village to be part of the Zichenau (region) of East Prussia.
In the years 1975–1998, the town was administratively part of the Plock province.

References

Villages in Płock County